Duluth is the fourth studio release by Duluth, Minnesota group Trampled by Turtles. All songs written by Dave Simonett, except for where noted. This was the first album from the band to chart. It reached number 8 on the US Bluegrass Chart. The album was released on October 30th, 2008.

Personnel
 Dave Simonett – guitar, lead vocals, harmonica
 Tim Saxhaug – bass, backing vocals
 Dave Carroll – banjo, backing vocals
 Erik Berry – mandolin
 Ryan Young – fiddle, backing vocals

2008 albums
Trampled by Turtles albums